Digital Jungle is a cross cultural, digital marketing agency headquartered in Beijing, China. The core business of this agency is to work with Western organizations to market their products and services to a Chinese speaking audience. The agency creates and curates content, then distributes it over multiple marketing channels such as social media (SMM), on social platforms such as Sina Weibo, Tencent Weibo, WeChat, Twitter & Facebook as well as via search engine marketing and mobile/community applications.

Origins 

Digital Jungle was founded in January 2011 by Dr. Mathew McDougall.

The initial focus of the Agency was to provide digital marketing services to Western firms looking at undertaking digital marketing activities in China. However, in response to the rapidly growing affluent Chinese consumer, the focus of the Agency shifted towards marketing to a Chinese speaking audience irrespective of where they were located.

Services 

Digital Jungle provides brand marketing and strategy, Content Marketing, Search Engine Optimization, Search Engine Marketing, Social Media Analytics, Mobile Marketing, Community development and management services.

Clients overview 

The company's list of clients includes:
Lexus, Bentley, Cover-More, CITS, New Zealand Trade & Entreprise, AusTrade, Global Blue, PATA, CYTS, Hawaii Tourism, Tourism Fiji

Offices 

Digital Jungle has offices in a number of locations:
 Beijing, China (HQ)
 Shanghai, China
 Auckland, New Zealand
 Sydney, Australia
 London, UK

References 

 Digital Jungle partners with Saatchi Fallon in Tokyo, Saatchi & Saatchi News, 9 February 2012
 Dr. McDougall's Presentation at Amplify Festival 2011, Marketing Interactive Magazine, 10 June 2011
 Dr. Mathew McDougall, Chinese Social Media Universe, 2nd Edition, March 2012

External links 
 
 

Marketing companies established in 2011
Companies based in Beijing